Midway may refer to the following communities in the U.S. state of West Virginia:
Midway, Fayette County, West Virginia, an unincorporated community
Midway, Mercer County, West Virginia, an unincorporated community
Midway, Putnam County, West Virginia, an unincorporated community
Midway, Raleigh County, West Virginia, an unincorporated community